The 31st Air Division (31st AD) is an inactive United States Air Force organization.  Its last assignment was with Air Defense Command, assigned to Tenth Air Force, being stationed at Sioux City Municipal Airport, Iowa.  It was inactivated on 31 December 1969.

History

Assigned to Air Defense Command (ADC) for most of its existence, the division equipped, administered, trained, and provided combat ready forces within an area covering North Dakota, South Dakota, Nebraska, Minnesota, and other parts of the Midwest. The division participated in numerous live and simulated exercises such as Creek Chief, Pawnee Knife, and Mandan Hunt.

Later, beginning in 1966, the 31st assumed responsibility for the former Oklahoma City Air Defense Sector and covered an area including Texas, Oklahoma, Arkansas, and Louisiana. Assumed additional designation of 31st NORAD Region after activation of the NORAD Combat Operations Center at the Cheyenne Mountain Complex, Colorado and reporting was transferred to NORAD from ADC at Ent Air Force Base in April 1966.

Inactivated in December 1969 as ADC phased down its interceptor mission as the chances of a Soviet bomber attack on the United States seemed remote, its mission being consolidated into North American Aerospace Defense Command (NORAD).

Lineage
 Established as the 31st Air Division (Defense) on 7 September 1950
 Activated on 8 October 1950
 Inactivated on 1 February 1952
 Organized on 1 February 1952
 Inactivated on 1 January 1960
 Redesignated 31st Air Division and activated on 20 January 1966 (not organized)
 Organized on 1 April 1966
 Inactivated on 31 December 1969

Assignments
 Air Defense Command
 Eastern Air Defense Force, 8 October 1950 (attached 30th Air Division, 27 November 1950 – 1 February 1951
 Central Air Defense Force, 20 May 1951 – 1 January 1960
 Air Defense Command, 20 January 1966 (not organized)
 Fourteenth Air Force, 1 April 1966 – 1 July 1968 (ConAC)
 Tenth Air Force, 1 July 1968 – 31 December 1969

Stations
 Selfridge Air Force Base, Michigan, 8 October 1950 – 1 February 1952
 Fort Snelling (later Snelling Air Force Station), Minnesota, 1 February 1952 – 1 January 1960
 Oklahoma City Air Force Station, Oklahoma, 1 April 1966 – 31 December 1969

Components

Sectors
 Duluth Air Defense Sector: 20 December 1957 – 1 January 1959
 Duluth Municipal Airport, Minnesota
 Grand Forks Air Defense Sector: 8 December 1957 – 1 January 1959
 Grand Forks Air Force Base, North Dakota

Groups
 53d Fighter Group: 18 August 1955 – 1 March 1956
 Sioux City Municipal Airport, Iowa
 343d Fighter Group: 18 August 1955 – 1 January 1959
 Duluth Municipal Airport, Minnesota
 475th Fighter Group: 18 August 1955 – 2 January 1958
 Minneapolis-Saint Paul Municipal Airport, Minnesota
 478th Fighter Group: 8 February 1957 – 1 January 1959
 Grand Forks Air Force Base, North Dakota
 514th Air Defense Group: 16 February 1953 – 18 August 1955
 Minneapolis-Saint Paul Municipal Airport, Minnesota
 515th Air Defense Group: 16 February 1953 – 18 August 1955
 Duluth Municipal Airport, Minnesota
 521st Air Defense Group: 16 February 1953 – 18 August 1955.
 Sioux City Municipal Airport, Iowa

Interceptor squadrons

 11th Fighter-Interceptor Squadron: 1 December 1952 – 16 February 1953
 Duluth Municipal Airport, Minnesota
 18th Fighter-Interceptor Squadron: 1 December 1952 – 16 February 1953
 Minneapolis-Saint Paul Municipal Airport, Minnesota
 54th Fighter-Interceptor Squadron: 1 December 1952 – 16 February 1953
 Ellsworth Air Force Base, South Dakota
 87th Fighter-Interceptor Squadron: 1 November 1952 – 16 February 1953
 Sioux City Municipal Airport, Iowa

 331st Fighter-Interceptor Squadron: 1 April 1966 – 1 March 1967
 Webb Air Force Base, Texas
 432d Fighter-Interceptor Squadron: 1 December 1952 – 16 February 1953
 Truax Field, Wisconsin
 433d Fighter-Interceptor Squadron: 1 November 1952 – 16 February 1953
 Truax Field, Wisconsin

Radar squadrons

 650th Aircraft Control and Warning Squadron
 Dallas Center Air Force Station, Iowa, 1 July 1955 – 1 March 1956
 676th Aircraft Control and Warning Squadron
 Antigo Air Force Station, Wisconsin, 6 February 1952 – 16 February 1953
 683d Aircraft Control and Warning Squadron
 Sweetwater Air Force Station, Texas, 1 April 1966 – 30 September 1969
 687th Aircraft Control and Warning Squadron
 West Mesa Air Force Station, New Mexico, 1 April 1966 – 8 September 1968
 688th Aircraft Control and Warning Squadron
 Amarillo Air Force Base, Texas, 1 April 1966 – 8 September 1968
 692d Aircraft Control and Warning Squadron
 Baudette Air Force Station, Minnesota, 1 October 1958 – 1 January 1959
 703d Aircraft Control and Warning Squadron
 Texarkana Air Force Station, Arkansas, 1 April 1966 – 8 September 1968
 707th Aircraft Control and Warning Squadron
 Grand Rapids Air Force Station, Minnesota, 1 July 1956 – 1 January 1959
 739th Aircraft Control and Warning Squadron
 Wadena Air Force Station, Minnesota, 1 February 1953 – 1 January 1959
 740th Aircraft Control and Warning Squadron
 Rapid City Air Force Base, South Dakota, 1–16 February 1953
 741st Aircraft Control and Warning Squadron
 Lackland Air Force Base, Texas, 1 April 1966 – 31 December 1969
 745th Aircraft Control and Warning Squadron
 Perrin Air Force Station, Texas, 1 April 1966 – 30 September 1969

 746th Aircraft Control and Warning Squadron
 Oklahoma City Air Force Station, Oklahoma, 1 April 1966 – 8 September 1968
 756th Aircraft Control and Warning Squadron
 Finland Air Force Station, Minnesota, 6 February 1952 – 1 July 1959
 785th Aircraft Control and Warning Squadron
 Finley Air Force Station, North Dakota, 6 February 1952 – 16 February 1953
 786th Aircraft Control and Warning Squadron
 Minot Air Force Station, North Dakota, 6 February 1952 – 16 February 1953
 787th Aircraft Control and Warning Squadron
 Chandler Air Force Station, Minnesota, 6 February 1952 – 1 January 1959
 788th Aircraft Control and Warning Squadron
 Waverly Air Force Station, Iowa, 6 February 1952 – 1 March 1956
 789th Aircraft Control and Warning Squadron
 Omaha Air Force Station, Nebraska, 6 February 1952 – 1 March 1956
 791st Aircraft Control and Warning Squadron
 Hanna City Air Force Station, Illinois, 6 February 1952 – 1 March 1956
 808th Aircraft Control and Warning Squadron
 Rochester Air Force Station, Minnesota, 1 September 1955 – 9 September 1957
 903d Aircraft Control and Warning Squadron]
 Gettysburg Air Force Station, South Dakota, 1 March 1956 – 1 January 1959
 915th Aircraft Control and Warning Squadron
 Sioux Lookout Air Station, Ontario, 16 December 1952 – 1 January 1959
 916th Aircraft Control and Warning Squadron
 Beausejour Air Station, Manitoba, 1 December 1952 – 1 January 1959

See also
 List of United States Air Force Aerospace Defense Command Interceptor Squadrons
 List of United States Air Force air divisions
 United States general surveillance radar stations

References

Notes

Bibliography

 
 
 "ADCOM's Fighter Interceptor Squadrons". The Interceptor (January 1979) Aerospace Defense Command, (Volume 21, Number 1)

Aerospace Defense Command units
031
1950 establishments in Michigan
1969 disestablishments in Oklahoma